Dato Pandelela Rinong Pamg,  (born 2 March 1993) is a Malaysian diver. She has won two Olympic medals and seven World Championships medals.

Pandelela represented Malaysia at the 2008 Summer Olympics where she finished 27th in 10m platform. She won the gold medal at the 2010 Commonwealth Games. She was chosen to be the flagbearer of Malaysia at the 2012 Summer Olympics. She went on to win the bronze medal in the 10m platform, becoming the first Malaysian female athlete to win an Olympic medal, as well as the first in any sport other than badminton. At the 2016 Summer Olympics, she won the silver medal in the 10m synchronized platform with Cheong Jun Hoong.

Early and personal life
Pandelela was born in (Kampung) Kupuo Jugan, a Bidayuh village in Bau, Sarawak to Hartini Lamim and Pamg Joheng. She is of Bidayuh ethnicity, a Bumiputera native to the Malaysian state of Sarawak. She is the second of four siblings. At the age of seven she was selected as a state diver and continued her training at the Bukit Jalil Sports School. She graduated from University of Malaya in 2018, majoring in Sports Management Science.

Pandelela speaks Mandarin as well as her Bidayuh mother tongue, Malay and English.

Career
Pandelela made her international competition debut in 2007 at the Asian Junior Aquatics Championships where she won four gold medals. At the 2007 Southeast Asian Games in Thailand, she won the gold medal in 10m synchronized platform with Cheong Jun Hoong.

Pandelela made her Olympic debut at the 2008 Beijing Olympics as a 15-year-old. She finished 27th in the 10 m platform. At the 2009 World Aquatics Championships, she finished fifth in the 10 m platform. She went on to win the bronze medal in the 10 m synchronized platform with Leong Mun Yee where it was also the first-ever diving medal for Malaysia at the World Championships.

Pandelela won two gold medal at the 2009 Southeast Asian Games in Vientiane. She was the Malaysian national flag bearer  the 2010 Summer Youth Olympics in Singapore where she won the silver medals in the 10 m platform event and 3 m springboard event.

At the 2010 Commonwealth Games in New Delhi, she won Malaysia's debut Commonwealth Games gold medal in an aquatic sport by winning the 10 m platform event. At the 2010 Asian Games in Guangzhou, she won the bronze medal in 10 m platform and the silver medal in 10m synchronized platform with Leong Mun Yee.

Pandelela was Team Malaysia national flag bearer 2012 Summer Olympics opening ceremony, the debut Malaysian Olympic female athlete to be accorded the honour. She competed in the individual 10 m platform, 3m synchronized springboard with Cheong Jun Hoong and the 10 m synchronised platform event with Leong Mun Yee.

She became the first Malaysian female athlete to win an Olympics medal, and the first Malaysian athlete to win an Olympics medal in a sport besides badminton by winning a bronze medal in the 10 m platform at the 2012 Summer Olympics in London. To commemorate her success, she was presented with the Johan Bintang Kenyalang (Companion of the Order of the Star of Hornbill) by the Sarawak State Government, in a special investiture ceremony held at the Astana shortly after her triumphant return to her homeland. She became Sarawak's first athlete to be accorded with the award.

At the 2013 World Aquatics Championships in Barcelona, Pandelela and Mun Yee clinch the bronze medal in 10m synchronized platform with 331.14 points. She also finished sixth in individual 10m platform event. At the 2013 Southeast Asian Games in Naypyidaw, she retained her gold medal in 10m platform event.

Pandelela competed at the 2014 Commonwealth Games in Glasgow. Despite a knee injury, she won the bronze medal in 10m synchronized platform with Nur Dhabitah Sabri. She also bagged a silver in the 10m platform with a score of 368.55 points. At the 2014 Asian Games in Incheon, she won the bronze medal in 10 m synchro platform with Leong Mun Yee.

In July 2015, Pandelela made history when she became the first Malaysian to finish on the podium in an individual event at the World Aquatics Championships. She clinched a bronze medal in the individual 10 m platform in Kazan and qualify for the 2016 Rio de Janeiro Olympics in Brazil.

At the 2016 Summer Olympics in Rio de Janeiro, she won the silver medal in the 10 m synchronized platform with Cheong Jun Hoong, becoming the first Malaysian women's team to win a silver medal at the Olympics. In honour of her achievement at the 2016 Summer Olympics, The Sarawak Aquatic Centre in Petra Jaya, Sarawak was officially named Pandelela Rinong Aquatic Centre. After 2016 Summer Olympics, Pandelela took a break to recuperate from back and shoulder injuries.

At the 2017 World Aquatics Championships in Budapest, she won the bronze medal in 10 m synchronized platform with Cheong Jun Hoong. She finished ninth in the individual 10m platform which was won by her partner, Jun Hoong. At the 2017 Southeast Asian Games in Kuala Lumpur, she won the gold medal in newly introduced team event with Gabriel Gilbert Daim. She also retained her gold medal in the individual 10m platform event.

At the 2021 FINA Diving World Cup in Tokyo, Japan, she won the gold medal in the individual 10 m platform. She placed fourth in the synchronized 10 m platform together with Leong Mun Yee.

At the 2020 Summer Olympics in Tokyo,  Pandelela and diving partner Leong Mun Yee finished eighth in the women's 10m synchronized platform.

Awards
 SAM-100PLUS Best Athlete: 2010, 2012, 2015
 National Sportswoman of the Year: 2011, 2012. 2015, 2021
 Sarawak Sportswoman of the Year: 2010, 2011–12
 NPC-Tan Sri SM Nasimuddin SM Amin 1Malaysian of the Year: 2012
 TM Fans Pick Awards – Glorious Moment: 2015
 Sarawak Sports Youth Icon
 UM Sportswoman of the Year: 2016
 UM Special Badge of University Sports

Honours

Honours of Malaysia
  :
  Member of the Order of the Defender of the Realm (AMN) (2016)

  :
  Companion of the Order of the Star of Hornbill Sarawak (JBK) (2016)
  Commander of the Most Exalted Order of the Star of Sarawak (PSBS) – Dato (2021)

Controversy
In June 2018, Pandelela and six other divers were caught in controversy after a video showed them partying and drinking alcohol during a training camp in Guangzhou, China. The video was allegedly recorded on the eve of Chinese New Year day. Following the incident, the Amateur Swimming Union of Malaysia (ASUM) suspended the allowances of the seven national divers with immediate effect with more disciplinary action set to follow. Pandelela and the six other divers apologised publicly and promised the incident will not be repeated. ASUM announced later that no further action will be taken to the seven divers as the divers have already expressed remorse for their actions.

References

Bibliography

External links

1993 births
Living people
People from Sarawak
Bidayuh people
Malaysian female divers
Olympic divers of Malaysia
Olympic medalists in diving
Olympic silver medalists for Malaysia
Olympic bronze medalists for Malaysia
Divers at the 2008 Summer Olympics
Divers at the 2012 Summer Olympics
Divers at the 2016 Summer Olympics
Medalists at the 2012 Summer Olympics
Medalists at the 2016 Summer Olympics
Divers at the 2010 Summer Youth Olympics
Asian Games medalists in diving
Divers at the 2010 Asian Games
Divers at the 2014 Asian Games
Divers at the 2018 Asian Games
Commonwealth Games gold medallists for Malaysia
Commonwealth Games silver medallists for Malaysia
Commonwealth Games bronze medallists for Malaysia
Divers at the 2010 Commonwealth Games
Divers at the 2014 Commonwealth Games
Divers at the 2018 Commonwealth Games
Members of the Order of the Defender of the Realm
Companions of the Order of the Star of Hornbill Sarawak
World Aquatics Championships medalists in diving
Asian Games silver medalists for Malaysia
Asian Games bronze medalists for Malaysia
Commonwealth Games medallists in diving
Medalists at the 2010 Asian Games
Medalists at the 2014 Asian Games
Universiade medalists in diving
Southeast Asian Games gold medalists for Malaysia
Southeast Asian Games silver medalists for Malaysia
Southeast Asian Games medalists in diving
Competitors at the 2007 Southeast Asian Games
Competitors at the 2009 Southeast Asian Games
Competitors at the 2011 Southeast Asian Games
Competitors at the 2013 Southeast Asian Games
Competitors at the 2015 Southeast Asian Games
Competitors at the 2017 Southeast Asian Games
Universiade silver medalists for Malaysia
Universiade bronze medalists for Malaysia
Medalists at the 2011 Summer Universiade
Divers at the 2020 Summer Olympics
Competitors at the 2021 Southeast Asian Games
Divers at the 2022 Commonwealth Games
21st-century Malaysian women
Medallists at the 2014 Commonwealth Games